Sara Ghulam (born May 3, 1989, in Toronto, Ontario) is a Canadian model. She comes from a multicultural family of Indian, Pakistani, Maltese, and Scottish backgrounds.

Ghulam was crowned Miss World Canada 2007 on March 18, 2007, making her the youngest winner of the title. She placed first in the Talent segment for her rendition of Sara McLachlens "Angel", and won Best in Evening Gown. She also placed top 5 in the Interview, Swimsuit and the Peoples Choice Award segments. As the reigning Miss World Canada 2007, she has already made several high-profile appearances, including representing Canada at the 2007 Miss World pageant in Sanya, Hainan Island, China, in November 2007. Ghulam is currently pursuing a career in the music industry as a pop singer.

References

External links
Miss World Canada 2007
Sara G Music - Official Website

1989 births
Living people
Female models from Ontario
Canadian people of Maltese descent
Canadian people of Pakistani descent
Canadian people of Scottish descent
Miss World 2007 delegates
People from Toronto
Miss World Canada winners
Canadian models of Pakistani descent